

D10A Anti-acne preparations for topical use

D10AA Corticosteroids, combinations for treatment of acne
D10AA01 Fluorometholone
D10AA02 Methylprednisolone
D10AA03 Dexamethasone

D10AB Preparations containing sulfur
D10AB01 Bithionol
D10AB02 Sulfur
D10AB03 Tioxolone
D10AB05 Mesulfen

D10AD Retinoids for topical use in acne
D10AD01 Tretinoin
D10AD02 Retinol
D10AD03 Adapalene
D10AD04 Isotretinoin
D10AD05 Motretinide
D10AD06 Trifarotene
D10AD51 Tretinoin, combinations
D10AD53 Adapalene, combinations
D10AD54 Isotretinoin, combinations

D10AE Peroxides
D10AE01 Benzoyl peroxide
D10AE51 Benzoyl peroxide, combinations

D10AF Anti-infectives for treatment of acne
D10AF01 Clindamycin
D10AF02 Erythromycin
D10AF03 Chloramphenicol
D10AF04 Meclocycline
D10AF05 Nadifloxacin
D10AF06 Sulfacetamide
D10AF07 Minocycline
D10AF51 Clindamycin, combinations
D10AF52 Erythromycin, combinations

D10AX Other anti-acne preparations for topical use
D10AX01 Aluminium chloride
D10AX02 Resorcinol
D10AX03 Azelaic acid
D10AX04 Aluminium oxide
D10AX05 Dapsone
D10AX06 Clascoterone
D10AX30 Various combinations

D10B Anti-acne preparations for systemic use

D10BA Retinoids for treatment of acne
D10BA01 Isotretinoin

D10BX Other anti-acne preparations for systemic use
D10BX01 Ichtasol

References

D10